Instructor-assisted deployment (IAD) is a parachute deployment program most adequately similar to static line.  The main difference is that instead of being deployed by a static line, the student's jumpmaster (who is in the plane with them) deploys the student's parachute by throwing the pilot chute downward and clear of the door as the student exits.

Among the benefits to IAD is the ability to use the same parachute equipment as the students will use when they progress to deploying their parachutes on their own, and the decreased chance of an inconvenience called line twists. Furthermore, in the situation of a bag lock malfunction, the student won't stay attached to the plane.

Parachuting